The Tenth Woman is a lost 1924 silent film drama directed by James Flood and starring Beverly Bayne. It is based on a novel by Harriet T. Comstock. Warner Brothers produced the feature.

Cast
Beverly Bayne - Willa Brookes
John Roche - Barry Compton
June Marlowe - Rose Ann Brainherd
Raymond McKee - Billy Brainherd
Charles A. Post - Donaldson (*as Charles 'Buddy' Post)
Gilbert Holmes - Shorty
Alec B. Francis - Mr. Brainherd
Edith Yorke - Mrs. Brainherd

References

External links

film image on book jacket cover

1924 films
American silent feature films
Lost American films
Films directed by James Flood
Warner Bros. films
American black-and-white films
1924 drama films
Silent American drama films
Lost drama films
1924 lost films
1920s American films
1920s English-language films